Josef Lomický (born 19 February 1958) is a retired Czech sprinter. He competed in the men's 4 × 400 metres relay at the 1980 Summer Olympics.

International competitions

References

External links
 

1958 births
Living people
Athletes (track and field) at the 1980 Summer Olympics
Czech male sprinters
Olympic athletes of Czechoslovakia
Place of birth missing (living people)